Azov is a town in Rostov Oblast, Russia.

Azov may also refer to:

Military
Azov Regiment, a unit of the National Guard of Ukraine
Azov campaigns (1695–1696), military campaigns during the Russo-Turkish War of 1686–1700
Sea of Azov naval campaign (1855), fought during the Crimean War
Battle of the Sea of Azov (1941), fought during the Second World War

Places
Azov, Novoazovsk Raion, Ukraine
Azov-Black Sea Krai, a krai in Russia SFSR
Mount Azov, a mountain in Central Ural, Russia
Sea of Azov, a sea in Eastern Europe

Transportation
Azov (1826 ship), a Russian ship of the line
Azov Avia Airlines, an airline based in Melitopol, Ukraine
Russian cruiser Azov, a Soviet and later Russian missile cruiser
, a number of ships with this name

Other uses
Memory of Azov (Fabergé egg), a jewelled Easter egg
FC APK Morozovsk, a Russian football team formerly known as Luch Azov and APK Azov

See also

 Irving Azoff (born 1947), U.S. entertainment executive